Michael Joseph Kahoe  (September 3, 1873 – May 14, 1949) was a catcher in Major League Baseball. Kahoe was one of the first catchers to wear shin guards. Kahoe was born on September 3, 1873 in Yellow Springs, Ohio, and made his Major League Baseball debut on September 22, 1895 with the Cincinnati Reds.

References

Major League Baseball catchers
Cincinnati Reds players
Chicago Orphans players
Chicago Cubs players
St. Louis Browns players
Philadelphia Phillies players
Washington Senators (1901–1960) players
People from Yellow Springs, Ohio
Columbus Babies players
Columbus River Snipes players
Montgomery Senators players
Columbus Buckeyes (minor league) players
Columbus Senators players
Indianapolis Indians players
Indianapolis Hoosiers (minor league) players
19th-century baseball players
1873 births
Baseball players from Ohio
1949 deaths